This is a disambiguation page for the name Arenas. For the sporting event venue, see arena; for other meanings of arena, see arena (disambiguation).

Arenas (meaning sands in Spanish) may refer to:

Persons
Abbygale Arenas (born 1974), Filipina contestant in the Miss Universe 1997 pageant
Albert Arenas (born 1996), Spanish motorcycle racer
Braulio Arenas (1913–1988), Chilean poet and writer
Eddie Arenas (born 1930), Filipino actor
Gabriel Fernández Arenas (born 1983), Spanish footballer
Gilbert Arenas (born 1982), American professional basketball player
Jacobo Arenas (1924–1990), nom de guerre of Luis Morantes, founder and ideological leader of the Colombian FARC-EP
Javier Arenas (American football) (born 1987), American football player
Javier Arenas (politician) (born 1957), Spanish politician
Juan Pablo Arenas (born 1987), Chilean soccer player
Reinaldo Arenas (1943–1990), Cuban poet, novelist, and playwright
Rose Marie Arenas (born 1938), Filipina socialite and philanthropist
Yolanda Arenas, Cuban actress

Places
Arenas, Málaga, Spain
Arenas de San Juan, Ciudad Real, Spain
Arenas de San Pedro, Ávila, Spain
Arenas, Panama
Punta Arenas, a city in Chile
Arenas, Cidra, Puerto Rico
Arenas, Utuado, Puerto Rico

Other
Arenas CD, a football team in Andalusia, Spain
Arenas Club de Getxo, a football club in Guecho, Spain
Toronto Arenas, a professional hockey team in Toronto, Canada
Arenas River (disambiguation)

See also
Arena (disambiguation)
Arenas River (disambiguation)
Larena (disambiguation), for Larenas